The 2012 Belarusian Super Cup was held on 6 March 2012 between the 2011 Belarusian Premier League champions BATE Borisov and the 2010–11 Belarusian Cup winners Gomel. Gomel won the match 2–0 and became the first team other than BATE to win a trophy.

Match details

See also
2011 Belarusian Premier League
2010–11 Belarusian Cup

References

Belarusian Super Cup
Super
Belarusian Super Cup 2012